Niels de Ruiter  (born January 21, 1983 in Lelystad, Flevoland) is a former Dutch darts player and former chairman of the Dutch Darts Federation.

Career

On the darts circuit his nickname is The Excellent Dude, which is a reference from the film Bill & Ted's Excellent Adventure. He is also known for using Metallica's 'Enter Sandman' as his walk-on music, which he plays air guitar as he enters the stage.

He began playing darts in 1999, but it wasn't until 2005 de Ruiter became popular in the BDO circuit when he reached the semi-finals of the Welsh Open and the Welsh Classic. 
De Ruiter made his World Championship debut in the 2006 Lakeside World Championship, but lost in the first round to Shaun Greatbatch.
De Ruiter was runner-up to Welshman Mark Webster in the 2006 WDF Europe Cup.
In the 2007 World Championships, held at the Lakeside, De Ruiter made an excellent run by reaching the semi-finals, narrowly losing 6-4 in sets to the late Phill Nixon who would later finish runner-up to eventual champion Martin Adams.
In the 2008 World Championships, De Ruiter was eliminated in the first round, losing to Englishman Glenn Moody.

De Ruiter played very few tournaments during early stages of 2008 due to vertigo and quit darts for three months until he came back to the game.  He recovered and returned to the sport during the latter stages of the year to participate in the 2008 Grand Slam of Darts. De Ruiter was drawn in a tough group consisting of James Wade, Adrian Lewis and Denis Ovens. He only won a single leg during the three group matches and suffered two whitewash losses to Lewis and Ovens.  De Ruiter then failed to qualify for the 2009 BDO World Darts Championship and also for the last 16 stage of the World Masters.

In 2012, De Ruiter returned to the Lakeside having failed to qualify, but having overseen a record eight Dutch players reaching the televised stages. Due to his fluent English, De Ruiter became a translator for one of these players, Christian Kist. Kist made an exceptional run by winning the tournament. De Ruiter has failed to qualify for any major tournaments since.

World Championship Results

BDO

 2006: 1st Round (lost to Shaun Greatbatch 2-3)
 2007: Semi-Finals (lost to Phill Nixon 4-6)
 2008: 1st Round (lost to Glenn Moody 1-3)

Career finals

WDF major finals: 1 (1 runner-up)

Performance timeline

External links
Official web site
Profile and stats on Darts Database

1983 births
Living people
People from Lelystad
Dutch sports announcers
Dutch darts players
British Darts Organisation players
Sportspeople from Flevoland